Ingo Mogendorf (born 1940) is a German-born British actor, typically playing handsome and congenial German officers. He is best remembered as the Red Baron in a dogfight against Rock Hudson in Blake Edwards' Darling Lili. He worked as a male model in London in the 1970s.

Life
He was born in Germany on 2 December 1940. His exact birthplace is unclear but he certainly lived in Wuppertal in West Germany prior to coming to Britain   in 1968. Based in London he appears to primarily have been employed as a model but with frequent acting roles both in film and television. He was invariably cast as the handsome and genial German and often used to contrast with more Nazi-style counterparts.

He retired from acting in 1983/84 and moved to Puerto Banus near Marbella on the south coast of Spain, where he invested in a night-club.

Film Roles
see
Battle of Britain (1969) as pilot in Falke's crew
Outbreak of the 28th (1970)
The McKenzie Break (1970) as Lt Fullgrabe
Darling Lili (1970) as Baron Manfred von Richtofen
Murphy's War (1971) as Lt Voght
Up the Front (1972) as Cpt Hamburger

TV Roles
see
Doctor in the House (TV series) (1969) as Jorgen
Eyeless in Gaza (1971) as German peasant
Dad's Army (1971) as captured Nazi pilot
Mogul (TV series) (1971) as Sven
The Troubleshooters (1971) as 
Marked Personal (1974) as Klaus Muller
Spearhead (TV series) (1979) as Gerhard
BBC2 Playhouse:Unity (1980) as Lothar
Spy! (TV series) (1980) as Naujocks
Born and Bred (TV series) (1980) as Traveller
The Assassination Run (1980) as Scherer
BBC2 Playhouse: Caught on a Train (1980) as Keliner
Q.E.D. (TV series) (1982) 
By the Sword Divided (1983) as Ludwig
Auf Wiedersehen Pet (1983)
The Brief (1984) as German CID officer

References

Possibly living people
1940 births
Actors from Wuppertal
Dad's Army